Evgeni Ivanov (born September 9, 1993) is a Bulgarian professional basketball player, who is currently playing for BC Yambol in the Bulgarian League, as a small forward or shooting guard. Ivanov was born in Yambol and began his career in the local team - BC Yambol. In August 2012 he signed with BC Beroe. In November 2014 he returned to BC Yambol, after a few months with Chernomorets 2014.

References

External links
http://yambolbasketball.com/players/players2014-15/player-eivanov15.php
http://www.bgbasket.com/en//player.php?id=9708
http://basketball.eurobasket.com/player/Evgeni_Ivanov/204585

1993 births
Living people
BC Beroe players
BC Yambol players
Bulgarian men's basketball players
People from Yambol
Small forwards